Korean singer Seungri began his career as the main dancer and vocalist of the Korean hip hop group Big Bang.  His discography, as a solo artist, began in 2008, with the debut single "Strong Baby". He has released one studio album and two extended play, and several other singles/featured singles.

Studio albums

Extended plays

Singles

As a lead artist

As featured artist

Other charted songs

Soundtrack appearances

Production credits

Music videos

See also
 Big Bang discography

References

Discographies of South Korean artists